Second Nature is a 2003 American made-for-television drama mystery science fiction film directed by Ben Bolt starring Alec Baldwin, Powers Boothe and Louise Lombard. It was written by E. Max Frye and released on 4 October 2003 in the United Kingdom.

Cast
Alec Baldwin as Paul Kane
Powers Boothe 	as Kelton Reed
Louise Lombard as Dr. Harriet Fellows
Philip Jackson as Lawrence Augenblick
Kurtis O'Brien as Young Bobby
Leigh Zimmerman as Dr. Shepherd
Michele Austin as Nurse
Pip Torrens as Frank
Courtney Rowan as Emily Kane
Cornelia Winter as Amanda Kane
Daisy Donovan as Kristina Kane / Amy O'Brien
Charlie Lucas as Paperboy
Clive Mantle as Maynard
David Forrester as Hanna
Garrick Hagon as Man in Screening Room

Plot
Paul Kane is suffering from short-term memory loss after his plane crashes. Kelton Reed and Dr. Harriet Fellows help Kane to remember his earlier life.

References

External links
 

2003 films
American television films
American science fiction films
American mystery films
2000s American films